The second season of Shameless, an American comedy-drama television series based on the British series of the same name by Paul Abbott, premiered on January 8, 2012, at Sunday 9:00 p.m. EST on the Showtime television network. Executive producers are John Wells, Paul Abbott and Andrew Stearn, with producer Michael Hissrich. The season concluded after 12 episodes on April 1, 2012. The show's season premiere brought in 1.58 million viewers, which was higher than the season 1 premiere. The episode airing March 4, "Parenthood", received 1.6 million total viewers, its highest rated show of the season. The season finale scored 1.45 million viewers.

Plot
The second season begins in the summer, a few months after the events of season one. New developments shift in the lives of the Gallaghers' family and friends: Fiona is now waitressing alongside Veronica at a bar; Ian expresses interest in attending West Point; Mickey is sent back to jail after punching a cop; Karen has joined Sex Addicts Anonymous and has a new eccentric partner, Jody; Tony now lives in the house next door to the Gallaghers; Kevin and Veronica begin trying for a baby.

With Steve out of the picture, Fiona fails to find a better companion, and is upset when Steve returns to the United States with a wife, Estefania, a drug dealer's daughter whom he only married to survive. When Steve finds out Estefania is still interested in her ex-lover, Marco, Steve attempts to smuggle Marco into the United States to get back into Fiona's good graces. Meanwhile, Karen finds out she is pregnant, and hints to Lip that he may be the father. Though Jody initially takes Karen's hand in marriage, Karen realizes the marriage is a mistake and grows a hatred for her husband, kicking Jody out of her life and letting Lip back in. As her pregnancy progresses, Karen feels she would be an unfit mother and decides to put her baby up for adoption. The brush with becoming a father encourages Lip to drop out of school, creating a disagreement between Lip and Fiona.

Frank's abusive mother, Peggy "Grammy" Gallagher is released from prison on medical furlough and immediately storms trouble within the family's already hectic lives. Frank is troubled by Peggy's return, still scarred by his mother's abuse from childhood. When Peggy is diagnosed with terminal cancer, Fiona moves her grandmother into the care of Sheila and Jody, who look after Peggy during her final days. In the process, Sheila and Jody unexpectedly form a sexual relationship. In order to hasten her own death, Peggy dies at the request of being smothered, which is done willingly by Sheila. Frank, clearly conflicted over his mother's death, reconnects with Monica.

Though Fiona is suspicious, Monica comes back to care for the children and help out around the house, though unbeknownst to the rest of the family, she is not taking her medication. With Monica around, Fiona slowly begins to branch out for other opportunities—her reprieve is short-lived, however, when Monica and Frank find the family's stash of money and waste it all. Fiona breaks down and attempts to pick up the pieces, as she lets Steve slowly re-enter her life; Steve had successfully smuggled Marco into the United States to reunite with Estefania. During a family dinner, Monica attempts to commit suicide by slitting her wrists in the kitchen, traumatizing the family. Monica is transferred to a psych ward, from which she breaks out of with another patient, running away from her family once again.

On the day of Monica's attempted suicide, Karen gives birth in the hospital, but the baby boy is Asian and has Down syndrome. Karen reveals that the father is probably one of her classmates, Timmy Wong, and refuses to do anything with her child. Feeling betrayed by Karen, Lip angrily walks out on her. When the adoptive parents don't want Karen's baby because of his disability, Sheila and Jody steal the baby from the maternity ward to ensure he has a better future. When Sheila refuses to return the baby to the hospital, Karen gives her an ultimatum: choose her or the baby. Sheila chooses the baby.

Lip decides to return to school and he makes up with Fiona. The season concludes with a series of new storylines for the subsequent season: Sheila and Jody, now a couple, nickname Karen's baby "Hymie" after "Hiram." Spurned by her mother, Karen runs away, effectively ending her relationship with Lip. Steve, who the family regularly calls Jimmy now, is back together with Fiona. In the season's final scenes, the family gets rid of an unconscious Frank, removing him from their home and good graces.

Cast and characters

Regular
 William H. Macy as Frank Gallagher
 Emmy Rossum as Fiona Gallagher
 Justin Chatwin as Steve Wilton / Jimmy Lishman
 Ethan Cutkosky as Carl Gallagher
 Shanola Hampton as Veronica "V" Fisher
 Steve Howey as Kevin "Kev" Ball
 Emma Kenney as Debbie Gallagher
 Cameron Monaghan as Ian Gallagher
 Jeremy Allen White as Philip "Lip" Gallagher
 Laura Slade Wiggins as Karen Jackson
 Joan Cusack as Sheila Jackson (credited as "special guest star" in opening title sequence)

Special guest stars

 Louise Fletcher as Peggy Gallagher

Recurring
 Noel Fisher as Mickey Milkovich
 Emma Greenwell as Mandy Milkovich
 Zach McGowan as Jody Silverman
 Chloe Webb as Monica Gallagher
 James Wolk as Adam Lange 
 Pej Vahdat as Kash
 Jim Hoffmaster as Kermit
 Michael Patrick McGill as Tommy
 Amy Smart as Jasmine Hollander
 Tyler Jacob Moore as Tony Markovich
 Stephanie Fantauzzi as Estefania
 Dove Cameron as Holly Herkimer
 Vanessa Bell Calloway as Carol Fisher
 Madison Davenport as Ethel
 Harry Hamlin as Lloyd 'Ned' Lishman
 Marguerite Moreau as Linda
 Dennis Cockrum as Terry Milkovich
 Diora Baird as Meg

Episodes

Development and production
The show's second season began shooting on July 5, 2011 and it premiered on Sunday, January 8, 2012 at a new time slot at 9:00pm.

Casting
Noel Fisher, Pej Vahdat, Tyler Jacob Moore and Vanessa Bell Calloway return in the second season as Mickey Milkovich, Kash, Tony Markovich and Carol Fisher respectively. The role of Mandy Milkovich, which was originally played by Jane Levy in season one, was recast due to Levy landing a lead role in the ABC show Suburgatory. In late 2011, it was announced that Emma Greenwell would play Levy's character for the duration of the show. Zach McGowan was cast as Jody Silverman, Karen's love interest in the beginning of the season. Stephanie Fantauzzi was cast as Estefania, Steve's Brazilian wife.

Reception
Review aggregator Rotten Tomatoes gives the second season 100%, based on 11 reviews. The critics consensus reads, "The good times continue to roll in Shameless's second season as the series ups the ante with outrageous gags and unabashed joy for the ties that bind."

DVD release

References

External links
 
 

2012 American television seasons
Shameless (American TV series)